Sharko is a gender-neutral Ukrainian surname. Notable people with the surname include:

Greg Sharko, American tennis analyst 
Zinaida Sharko (1929–2016), Russian actress

See also
 
Sharkov
Charcot (disambiguation)

Ukrainian-language surnames